Kosmos. Problemy Nauk Biologicznych (eng. Cosmos. Problems of Biological Sciences) is the scientific journal of the Polish Copernicus Society of Naturalists published from 1876 initially in Lviv, then in Warsaw. Current numbers are available in the online edition.

See also 

Cosmos (disambiguation)#Journals

 Wszechświat (eng. The Universe)

References

Magazines established in 1876
Mass media in Warsaw
Mass media in Lviv
Magazines published in Poland
Polish-language magazines
Quarterly magazines
Science and technology magazines
1876 establishments in Austria-Hungary